West Valley High School is a public secondary school in Spokane Valley, Washington. It enrolls over 900 students in grades 9 through 12.  The school colors are orange and black and the mascot is the eagles.

As a Gates "Washington Achievers" grant high school, West Valley has started a mentor groups program.  Staff members meet with small groups of students daily to discuss issues in students' lives and connect with the students in the hopes that it will improve student experience and performance.

Extracurricular activities
Student clubs at West Valley High School include band, DECA, Drama, Knowledge Bowl, choir, a robotics team, and a collection of student-directed clubs.

Athletics
Fall sports include Football, Soccer, Volleyball, Cheerleading and Cross country. Winter sports are Basketball and Wrestling. In the spring, there is Tennis, Track and field, Baseball and Softball.

Notable alumni
Trevor St. John, actor who plays Todd Manning on One Life to Live and other movies/TV shows
Gary Martz, Former MLB player (Kansas City Royals)
Debra L. Stephens, Washington Supreme Court justice
Candace Dempsey, author

References

External links
 West Valley High School

Education in Spokane, Washington
Educational institutions established in 1924
High schools in Spokane County, Washington
Public high schools in Washington (state)
1924 establishments in Washington (state)